This list of the prehistoric life of Virginia contains the various prehistoric life-forms whose fossilized remains have been reported from within the US state of Virginia.

Precambrian
The Paleobiology Database records no known occurrences of Precambrian fossils in Virginia.

Paleozoic

Selected Paleozoic taxa of Virginia

 †Acmarhachis
 †Amplexopora
 †Ampyx
  †Archimedes
 †Arthrorhachis
 †Athyris
 †Athyris lamellosa
 †Atrypa
 †Atrypa reticularis
 †Aulopora
 †Aviculopecten
 †Bassleroceras
 †Bellerophon
 †Bellerophon spergensis – tentative report
 †Bimuria
 †Blountiella
  †Bothriolepis
 †Bumastus
 †Bumastus lioderma – or unidentified comparable form
 †Callixylon
 †Calymene
 †Calyptaulax
 †Camarotoechia
 †Camarotoechia contracta
 †Campbelloceras
 †Cardiopteris
 †Ceratocephala
 †Ceratopsis
 †Ceraurinella – type locality for genus
  †Ceraurus
 †Chasmatopora
 †Chonetes
 †Chonetes chesterensis
 †Chonetes novascoticus
 †Christiania
  †Cincinnetina
 †Cincinnetina meeki
 †Cincinnetina multisecta
 †Clarkoceras – tentative report
 †Cleiothyridina
 †Cleiothyridina sublamellosa – or unidentified comparable form
 †Climacograptus
 †Coleoloides
 †Columnaria
 †Composita
 †Composita subquadrata – or unidentified comparable form
 †Conocardium
  †Constellaria
 †Coosia
 †Coosina
 †Cornulites
 †Cornulites flexuosus – or unidentified comparable form
 †Craniops
 †Crepicephalus
 †Cryptophragmus
  †Cyrtoceras
 †Cyrtospirifer
 †Cystodictya
 †Cystodictya lineata
 †Dakeoceras
 †Dalmanites – or unidentified comparable form
 †Diplograptus
 †Echinosphaerites
 †Edmondia
 †Encrinuroides
 †Eophacops
 †Epiphyton
  †Ethmophyllum
 †Favosites
 †Fletcheria – tentative report
 †Flexicalymene
 †Flexicalymene senaria
 †Foerstia
 †Girvanella
 †Glauconome
 †Gonioceras
 †Hallopora
 †Helcionella
 †Heliomeroides
 †Hemithecella – type locality for genus
 †Holia
  †Holopea
 †Homagnostus
 †Hyolithellus
 †Hyolithes
 †Hypseloconus
 †Illaenus
  †Isotelus
 †Isotelus maximus
 †Kingstonia
 †Kionoceras
 †Komaspidella
 †Kootenia
 †Krausella
 †Kutorgina
 †Labyrinthus
 †Latouchella
  †Lepidodendron
 †Levisoceras
 Lingula
 †Lingulella – tentative report
 †Llanoaspis
 †Lonchodomas
 †Maryvillia
 †Meteoraspis
 †Michelinoceras
 †Microplasma
  †Miraspis
 †Naticopsis
 †Niobe
 †Nisusia
 Nucula
 †Odontopleura
  †Olenellus
 †Olenoides
 †Orthoceras
 †Oulodus
 †Ozarkodina
 †Pagetia
 †Paractinoceras
 †Paterina
 †Pemphigaspis
  †Pentremites
 †Phillipsia
 †Phragmolites
 †Phylloporina
 Pinna
 †Plaesiomys
 †Platyceras
 †Platystrophia
 †Plectoceras
 †Posidonia
 †Proetus
 †Protobarinophyton
 †Raymondaspis
  †Receptaculites
 †Remopleurides
 †Rhodea
 †Rothpletzella
 †Salterella
 †Siphonodella
 †Skenidioides
 Solemya
 †Solenopora
 †Solenopora compacta
 †Sowerbyella
 †Spathognathodus
 †Sphaerexochus
 †Sphaerocoryphe
 †Spirifer
 †Spyroceras
  †Strophomena
 †Strophomena filitexta
 †Strophomena incurvata
 †Subligaculum
 †Subulites
 †Syringopora
  †Tentaculites
 †Terranovella
 †Tetradium
 †Tricrepicephalus
 †Trinodus
 Trypanites
 †Wilkingia

Mesozoic

 †Abietites – or unidentified comparable form
 †Abietites longifolius
 †Acrostichites
 †Acrostichites linnaeaefolius
 †Agrestipus – type locality for genus
 †Agrestipus hottoni – type locality for species
 †Alisporites
 †Alisporites aequalis
 †Amblydactylus
 †Amblydactylus gethingi
 †Anchisauripus
 †Anchisauripus parallelus
  †Anomoepus
 †Appomatoxia – type locality for genus
 †Appomatoxia ancistrophora – type locality for species
 † Aquia – type locality for genus
 † Aquia
 †Aquia brookensis – type locality for species
 Aralia
 †Aralia dubia
 †Aratrisporites
 †Aratrisporites scabratus
 †Araucarites
 †Araucarites aquiensis
 †Arcellites
 †Arcellites disciformis
 †Arcellites pyriformis – or unidentified comparable form
 †Athrotaxis
 †Athrotaxis ungeri – or unidentified comparable form
 †Athrotaxopsis
 †Atreipus
 †Atreipus milfordensis
 †Auriculophora
 †Auriculophora acrostichoides
 †Boreogomphodon – type locality for genus
 †Boreogomphodon jeffersoni – type locality for species
 †Brachyphyllum
 †Brachyphyllum crassicaule
 †Brenneria – type locality for genus
 †Brenneria potomacensis – type locality for species
 †Brennerispermum – type locality for genus
 †Brennerispermum potomacensis – type locality for species
  †Brontopodus
 †Brontopodus birdi
 †Caririchnium
 †Caririchnium leonardii
 †Carpestella – type locality for genus
 †Carpestella lacunata – type locality for species
  †Chirotherium
 †Chirotherium lulli
 †Chirotherium parvum
  Cladophlebis
 †Cladophlebis auriculata
 †Cladophlebis constricta
 †Cladophlebis mexicana
 †Classopollis
 †Clathropteris
 †Clathropteris meniscoides
 †Colpectopollis
 †Colpectopollis ellipsoideus
 †Crudia
 †Crudia grahamiana – type locality for species
 †Crybelosporites
 †Crybelosporites striatus
 †Cyathocaulis
 †Cyathocaulis carolinensis
 †Cyathoforma
 †Cyathoforma carolinensis
 †Cyathoforma minuta
 †Cyathoforma penticarpa
 †Danaeopsis
 †Danaeopsis virginiensis
 †Decussosporites
 †Decussosporites microreticulatus
 †Delosorus
 †Delosorus heterophyllus
 †Dichotozamites
 †Dichotozamites cycadopsis
 Dicotylophyllum
 †Dicotylophyllum ovatodecurrens – type locality for species
 Dicranopteris
 †Dictyophylum
 †Dictyopygae
 †Dictyothylakos
 †Dictyothylakos pesslerae
  †Diplurus
  †Doswellia – type locality for genus
 †Doswellia kaltenbachi – type locality for species
 †Drewria
 †Echitriletes
 †Echitriletes lanatus – or unidentified comparable form
 †Emydhipus – or unidentified related form
 †Equisetites
 †Equisetites milleri
 †Equisetites richmondensis
 †Equisetites rogersii
  †Equisetum
 †Equisetum lyellii – or unidentified comparable form
 †Erlansonisporites
 †Erlansonisporites erlansonii
  †Eubrontes
 †Eubrontes approximus
 †Eubrontes giganteus
 †Eucommiidites
 †Euscolosuchus – type locality for genus
 †Euscolosuchus olseni – type locality for species
 †Exesipollenites
 †Ficophyllum
 †Ficophyllum crassinerve
 †Gleichenites
 †Gleichenites distans
 †Gomphiosauridion – type locality for genus
 †Gomphiosauridion baileyae – type locality for species
  †Grallator
 †Grallator cuneatus
 †Grallator formosus
 †Gregaripus
 †Gwyneddichnium
 †Gwyneddichnium majore
 †Gypsichnites
 †Gypsichnites pacensis
 †Hypsiloichnus
 †Hypsiloichnus marylandicus
 †Isoetodendron
 †Isoetodendron striata
 †Juglandiphyllum
 †Juglandiphyllum integrifolium
 †Kayentapus
 †Kayentapus minor
 †Kenella – or unidentified related form
 †Lagenella
 †Lagenella martinii
 †Landonia
 †Landonia calophylla – or unidentified comparable form
 †Lapposisporites
 †Lapposisporites loricatus – or unidentified comparable form
 †Leptocyclotes
 †Leptocyclotes americana
  †Lissodus
 †Lonchopteris
 †Lonchopteris oblonga
 †Lunatisporites
 †Lunatisporites acutus
 †Macrotaeniopteris
 †Macrotaeniopteris crassinervis
 †Macrotaeniopteris magnifolia
 †Megalosauropus
 †Mertensides
 †Mertensides bullatus
 †Microconodon
 †Microconodon tenuirostris
 †Nageiopsis
 †Nageiopsis longifolia
 †Nelumbites
 †Nelumbites extenuinervis – type locality for species
 †Nelumbites minimus – or unidentified comparable form
  †Neocalamites
 †Neocalamites delawarensis – or unidentified comparable form
 †Neocalamites knowltonii
 †Neocalamites virginiensis
 †Onychopsis
 †Onychopsis latiloba
 †Ornithomimipus
 †Ornithomimipus angustus
  †Osmundites
 †Osmundites winterpockensis
 †Ovalipollis
 †Ovalipollis ovalis
 †Pabiania – or unidentified related form
 †Patinasporites
 †Patinasporites densus
 †Paxillitriletes
  †Pecopteris
 †Pecopteris rarinervis
 †Phlebopteris
 †Phlebopteris smithii – or unidentified comparable form
 †Pityopollenites
 †Pityopollenites neomundanus
 †Platanocarpus
 †Platanocarpus brookensis – type locality for species
 †Platanophyllum
 †Platanophyllum crassinerve
 †Plesiornis
 †Plesiornis pilulatus
 †Plicarizamites
 †Plicarizamites lanceolatus
 †Podozamites
 †Podozamites acutifolius
 †Podozamites lanceolatus
 †Podozamites tenuistriatus
 †Populophyllum
 †Populophyllum crassinerve
 †Potomacanthus
 †Potomacanthus lobatus
 †Primaraucaria
 †Primaraucaria wielandii
 †Protodiploxypinus
 †Protodiploxypinus doubingeri
 †Protohaploxypinus
 †Pseudofrenelopsis
 †Pseudofrenelopsis nathorstiana – type locality for species
 †Pseudofrenelopsis parceramosa
 †Pteridocaulis
 †Pteridocaulis facialis
 †Pteridocaulis rhombiformis
 †Pterophyllum
 †Pterophyllum affine
 †Pterophyllum braunianum
 †Pterophyllum descussatum
 †Pterophyllum giganteum
 †Pterophyllum grandifolium
 †Pterophyllum taxinum
 †Pterophyllum tenuinervis
  †Ptycholepis
 †Ptycholepis marshi
 †Redfieldius
 †Rothwellia – type locality for genus.
 †Rothwellia foveata – type locality for species
  †Rutiodon
 †Rutiodon manhattanensis – or unidentified comparable form
  †Sagenopteris
 †Sagenopteris rhoifolia
 †Sanmiguelia – tentative report
 †Sapindopsis
 †Sapindopsis  – or unidentified comparable form magnifolia/variabilis – informal
 †Sapindopsis minutifolia – type locality for species
 †Sapindopsis obtusifolia
 Sassafras
 †Sassafras bilobata
  †Sphenobaiera
 †Sphenobaiera striata
 †Sphenolepis
 †Sphenolepis sternbergiana
 †Sphenopteris
 †Sphenopteris lobata
 †Sphenopteris sitholeyi
 †Sphenozamites
 †Sphenozamites rogersianus
 †Stangerites
 †Stangerites obliqua
 †Stangerites planus
  Sterculia
 †Sterculia elegans
 †Sulcatisporites
 †Sulcatisporites kraeuseli
 †Taeniopteris
 †Taeniopteris diminuta
 †Tetrapodosaurus
 †Tetrapodosaurus borealis
 †Thodaya – type locality for genus. Preoccupied.
 †Thodaya sykesiae – type locality for species
 †Thylakosporites
 †Thylakosporites retiarius
 †Trassiflorites
 †Trassiflorites grandiflora
 †Triadispora
 †Triadispora modesta
 †Triadispora verrucata
 †Uatchitodon – type locality for genus
 †Uatchitodon kroehleri – type locality for species
 †Ulmiphyllum
 †Ulmiphyllum crassinerve
 †Vallasporites
 †Vallasporites ignacii
 †Vallasporites perspicuus
 †Verrutriletes
 †Verrutriletes carbunculus
 †Virginianthus – type locality for genus
 †Virginianthus calycanthoides – type locality for species
 †Watsoniocladus – type locality for genus
 †Watsoniocladus florinii – type locality for species
 †Watsoniocladus obatae
 †Watsoniocladus pseudoexpansum
 †Watsoniocladus ramonensis
 †Watsoniocladus valdensis
 †Watsoniocladus virginiensis – type locality for species
 †Xenodiphyodon – type locality for genus
 †Xenodiphyodon petraios – type locality for species
 †Zamiostrobus
 †Zamiostrobus lissocardius
 †Zamiostrobus triasiccus
  †Zamites
 †Zamites buchianus
 †Zamites powellii

Cenozoic

Selected Cenozoic taxa of Virginia

 Abies
 †Abra
 Acanthocybium
 Accipiter
  †Accipiter striatus
  Acipenser
 Acmaea
 Acteocina
 Acteon
 †Actinocyclus
 Actitis – or unidentified comparable form
 †Actitis macularia
 †Adeorbis
 Aegolius
 †Aegolius acadicus
 Aequipecten
 Aetobatus
 Aetomylaeus
 Agelaius
 †Agelaius phoeniceus
  †Aglaocetus
 †Aglyptorhynchus
 Albula
 Alca
 †Alca torda – or unidentified comparable form
 Alces – or unidentified comparable form
 †Alces alces
  †Allaeochelys
 Alnus
 Alopias
 Aluterus
 †Ambystoma
 Amia
 Ammonia
 †Ammonia tepida
 †Amonia
 †Ampelopsis
 Amyda – or unidentified comparable form
 Anachis
 Anadara
 †Anadara ovalis
  †Anadara transversa
 Anas
 †Anas crecca
  †Anas discors
 †Anas platyrhynchos – or unidentified comparable form
 Anguilla
 †Anguispira
 †Anguispira alternata
 Angulus
 Anomia
 †Anomia simplex
 †Anomotodon
  Anoxypristis
 †Anthus – or unidentified comparable form
 †Anthus spinoletta
 Aporrhais
 Arbacia
 †Archaeohippus
 †Archaeomanta
 Architectonica
  †Arctodus
 †Arctodus simus
 Argobuccinum
 Argopecten
 †Argopecten gibbus
 Arius – tentative report
 Asio
 †Asio flammeus – or unidentified comparable form
 Astarte
 †Astarte castanea
 Astrangia
 †Astrangia danae
 Astyris
 †Astyris lunata
 Athleta
 Balaena
 Balaenoptera
  †Balaenotus
 Balanophyllia
 Balanus
 †Balanus improvisus
 Barbatia
 Barnea
 Bartramia
 †Bartramia longicauda
 †Basilotritus
 Betula
 Bison
 †Bison bison
 Bittiolum
 †Bittiolum alternatum
 Blarina
  †Blarina brevicauda
  †Bohaskaia – type locality for genus
 †Bohaskaia monodontoides – type locality for species
 †Bolcyrus – or unidentified comparable form
 Bombycilla
 †Bombycilla cedrorum
 Bonasa
 †Bonasa umbellus
 †Bootherium
  †Bootherium bombifrons
 Boreotrophon
 Bos
 †Bos taurus
 Bostrycapulus
 †Bostrycapulus aculeatus
 Botaurus
 †Botaurus lentiginosus
 Brachidontes
 Branta
 †Branta bernicla
 †Brevoortia
 †Brychaetus
 Bubo
  †Bubo virginianus
 Buccella
 Buccinum
 †Buccinum undatum
 Bucephala
 †Bucephala albeola
  Bufo
 †Bufo woodhousei
 †Burnhamia
 Busycon
 †Busycon carica
 †Busycon contrarium
 Busycotypus
 †Busycotypus canaliculatus
 Buteo
  †Buteo jamaicensis
 †Buteo lineatus
 †Buteo platypterus
 Cadulus
 Caecum
 †Caecum cooperi
 Caestocorbula
 †Calippus
 Calliostoma
 †Callippus
 Callista
  Calonectris
 Cambarus
 †Cambarus bartonii – or unidentified comparable form
 †Canarium
 Cancellaria
 Cancer
 †Cancer irroratus
 Canis
  †Canis dirus
 †Canis latrans
 †Canis lupus – or unidentified comparable form
 Cantharus
 Canthon
 Capella
 †Capella gallinago
 Carcharhinus
 Carcharias
 Carcharodon
  †Carcharodon hastalis
 Carditamera
 †Carolinochelys
 †Carolinochelys wilsoni
 Carphophis
 †Carphophis amoenus
 Carya
 Castor
 †Castor canadensis
  †Castoroides
 †Castoroides ohioensis
 Catharus
 †Catinella
 Catoptrophorus
 †Catoptrophorus semipalmatus
 †Catostomus
 Celtis
 †Celtis occidentalis
 Cerithiopsis
 †Cerithiopsis greenii
 Certhia
 †Certhia familiaris
 †Cervalces – tentative report
  †Cervalces scotti
 Cervus
 †Cervus elaphus
 Cetorhinus
  †Cetotherium
 Chaetura
 †Chaetura pelagica
 Chama
 †Chama congregata
 Charadrius
 †Charadrius vociferus
 Chelydra
 †Chelydra serpentina
 †Chesapecten
  †Chesapecten jeffersonius
 Chione
 †Chione cancellata
 Chlamys
 †Chordeiles
  †Chordeiles minor
 Cibicides
 Cingula
 Circulus
 Cirsotrema
 Cistothorus
 †Cistothorus platensis – or unidentified comparable form
 Clavus – report made of unidentified related form or using admittedly obsolete nomenclature
 Clethrionomys
 †Clethrionomys gapperi
  Cliona
 Coccyzus
 Colaptes
 †Colaptes auratus
 Colinus
 †Colinus virginianus
 Coluber
 †Coluber constrictor
 †Columella
  Colus
 †Colus pygmaeus
 Condylura
 †Condylura cristata
 Contopus
 †Contopus virens
 Conus
  Corbula
 Corvus
 †Corvus brachyrhynchos
 Cotonopsis
 †Cotonopsis lafresnayi
 †Coupatezia
 †Crassinella lunulata
 Crassostrea
 †Crassostrea virginica
 Crepidula
 †Crepidula convexa
 †Crepidula fornicata
 †Crepidula plana
  †Cretolamna
 †Cretolamna appendiculata
  Crocodylus
 Crotalus
 †Crotalus adamanteus – or unidentified comparable form
 †Crotalus horridus
 Crucibulum
 †Crucibulum striatum
 Cryptobranchus
  †Cryptobranchus alleganiensis
 †Cryptogramma
 †Cryptosula pallasiana
 Cryptotis
 †Cryptotis parva
 Cucullaea
 Cumingia
 Cupuladria
 Cyanocitta
 †Cyanocitta cristata
 Cyclocardia
 †Cyclocardia borealis
  †Cyclopoma
 Cylichna
 †Cylindracanthus
 Cymatosyrinx
  †Cynelos
 Cynoscion
 †Cyrtopleura costata
 Dasyatis
 Dasypus
  †Dasypus bellus – or unidentified comparable form
 Dendrocopos
 †Dendroica – or unidentified comparable form
 †Dendroica coronata
 Dentalium
 Dentimargo
 †Dentimargo aureocinctus
 Desmognathus
 Diadophis
 Dicaelus
 Dinocardium
 †Dinocardium robustum
 Diodora
  †Diorocetus
  †Diplocynodon
 †Diplodonta punctata
 Discinisca
 †Discoaster
 Discus
 †Discus catskillensis
 †Dolicholatirus
 †Dolichonyx – or unidentified comparable form
 †Dolichonyx oryzivorus
 Donax
  †Donax variabilis
 Dosinia
 †Dosinia discus
 Dryocopus
 †Dryocopus pileatus
 Echinocardium
 Echinorhinus
 †Ecphora
  †Ecphora gardnerae
 †Ectopistes
  †Ectopistes migratorius
 †Egertonia
 Elaphe
 †Elaphe guttata – or unidentified comparable form
 †Elaphe obsoleta – or unidentified comparable form
 Electra
 Elphidium
 †Empidonax
 Ensis
 †Ensis directus
  †Eobalaenoptera – type locality for genus
 †Eobalaenoptera harrisoni – type locality for species
 †Eosphargis
  †Eosuchus
 †Eosuchus lerichei
 Epitonium
 †Epitonium humphreysii
 Eptesicus
 †Eptesicus fuscus
 Equus
 †Equus fraternus
 Eremophila
 †Eremophila alpestris
 Erethizon
  †Erethizon dorsatum
 Erolia
 Eschrichtius
 †Eschrichtius robustus
 Esox
 †Esox americanus – or unidentified comparable form
 Eulima
 Eumeces
 †Eumeces laticeps – or unidentified comparable form
 Eupleura
 †Eupleura caudata
  †Eurhinodelphis
 †Eurhinodelphis longirostris
 Euspira
 †Euspira heros
 Eutamias
 †Eutamias minimus
 Euvola
 Falco
  †Falco sparverius
 Felis
 †Felis domesticus
 Ficus
 Flabellum
 Fossarus
 Fusinus
 Gadus
  Galeocerdo
 †Galeocerdo aduncus
 †Galeocerdo contortus
 Galeodea
 Galeorhinus
 Galerita
 †Galerita bicolor – or unidentified comparable form
 Gallinula
 †Gallinula chloropus
 Gari
 Gastrochaena
 Gastrocopta
 †Gastrocopta armifera
 †Gastrocopta contracta
 Gavia
  †Gavialosuchus
 Gemma
 †Gemma purpurea
 Genota – or unidentified comparable form
 Geomys
 Geukensia
 †Geukensia demissa
 Gibbula – tentative report
  Ginglymostoma
 Glaucomys
  †Glaucomys sabrinus
 Globigerina
 Globulina
 Glossus
 Glycymeris
 †Glycymeris americana
 Granulina
 Grus
 †Grus americana
 †Hadrodelphis – or unidentified comparable form
 Halichoerus
  †Halichoerus grypus
 Hastula
 Helicodiscus
 †Helicodiscus parallelus
  Hemipristis
 †Hemipristis serra
 Heterodontus
 Hexanchus
 Hiatella
 †Hiatella arctica
 Hipponix
  †Homogalax – or unidentified related form
 Hydrobia
 †Hydrobia truncata
 Hydroides
 Hyla
 †Hyla crucifer – or unidentified comparable form
 Hylocichla
  †Hyopsodus – or unidentified comparable form
 †Hyposaurus – or unidentified comparable form
 †Icterus – or unidentified comparable form
  †Icterus spurius
 Ilyanassa
 †Ilyanassa obsoleta
 †Ilyanassa trivittata
 Ischadium
 †Ischadium recurvum
 Isistius
 Isognomon
  Istiophorus
 Isurus
 Junco
 †Junco hyemalis
  †Kentriodon
 Kuphus
 Kurtziella
 †Kurtziella cerina
 Lagena
 †Lagopus
 †Lagopus mutus – or unidentified comparable form
 Lamna
 Lampropeltis
 Larus
  †Larus hyperboreus
 Lasiurus
 †Lasiurus borealis
 Latirus
 Lepisosteus
 †Leptophoca
 †Leptophoca lenis
 †Leptoxis
 †Leptoxis carinata
 Lepus
  †Lepus americanus
 Libinia
 †Libinia dubia
 †Libinia emarginata
 †Limosa – or unidentified comparable form
 Linga
 †Lingulodinium machaerophorum
 Litiopa
 Littoraria
 †Littoraria irrorata
 Lontra
  †Lontra canadensis
  Lophius
 Lophodytes
 †Lophodytes cucullatus
 Lopholatilus
 Loxia
 Lucina
 Lunatia
 Lymnaea
 Lynx
  †Lynx rufus – or unidentified comparable form
 Lyonsia
 Macoma
 †Macoma balthica
 †Macoma tenta
 Macrocallista
 Makaira
 †Makaira nigricans – or unidentified comparable form
 †Mammut
 †Mammut americanum
 †Mammuthus
  †Mammuthus columbi
  †Mammuthus primigenius
 †Margaritaria
 Marginella
 Marmota
 †Marmota monax
 Masticophis
 †Masticophis flagellum
 Megaceryle
 †Megaceryle alcyon
  †Megalonyx
 †Megalonyx jeffersonii
 Megalops
 Megaptera
 Melanerpes
 †Melanerpes carolinus
 †Melanerpes erythrocephalus
 Meleagris
 †Meleagris gallopavo
 Melospiza
 †Melospiza melodia
  Membranipora
 Mephitis
  †Mephitis mephitis
 Mercenaria
 †Mercenaria mercenaria
 Mergus
  †Merychippus
 †Mesocetus
 Mesoplodon
  †Metaxytherium
 †Metopocetus – type locality for genus
 Microtus
 †Microtus chrotorrhinus
 †Microtus ochrogaster
 †Microtus pennsylvanicus
  †Microtus pinetorum
 †Microtus xanthognathus
 Mitrella
 Modiolus
 Mola
 Molothrus
 †Molothrus ater
 †Monotherium
 †Monotherium wymani
 Morus
  †Morus bassanus
 †Moxostoma
 Mulinia
 †Mulinia lateralis
 Musculus
 †Musculus lateralis
 Mustela
 †Mustela nivalis
†Mustela richardsonii
 †Mya
 †Mya arenaria
 Myliobatis
  †Mylohyus
 †Mylohyus fossilis
 Myotis
 †Myotis grisescens
 †Myotis keenii
 †Myotis lucifugus
 Myriophyllum
 Mytilus
 †Mytilus edulis
 Napaeozapus
  †Napaeozapus insignis
  Nassarius
 Naticarius
 Natrix
 Nebrius
 Negaprion
 Neofiber
 †Neopanope texana
Neogale
†Neogale frenata
†Neogale vison
 Neotoma
  †Neotoma floridana
 Nerodia
 †Nerodia sipedon
 Neverita
 †Nipa – or unidentified comparable form
 Niso
 †Nocomis
  †Nocomis raneyi – or unidentified comparable form
 Notophthalmus
 †Notophthalmus viridescens – or unidentified comparable form
  Notorhynchus
 Notorynchus
 †Noturus
 Nucula
 †Nucula proxima
 †Nuculana acuta
 †Nyssa
 Ochotona
 Ocypode
 Odobenus
  †Odobenus rosmarus
 Odocoileus
 †Odocoileus virginianus
 Odontaspis
  †Odontopteryx – tentative report
 Odostomia
 Oliva
 †Oliva sayana
 Olivella
 †Olivella mutica
 Ondatra
 †Ondatra zibethicus
 Onthophagus
 †Ontocetus – type locality for genus
 †Ontocetus emmonsi – type locality for species
  Opheodrys
 †Opsanus
  †Orycterocetus
 †Osteopygis
  †Ostracion
 Ostrea
 †Ostrea compressirostra
 †Otodus
  †Otodus megalodon
 Otus
 †Otus asio
 †Oxyrhina
 †Oxyura
 †Oxyura jamaicensis
 †Pachecoa
 †Palaeophis
 †Palaeorhincodon
 †Palaeosinopa – or unidentified comparable form
 Pandora
 Panopea
 Panopeus
 †Panopeus herbstii
 Panthera
  †Panthera leo
 †Paralbula
 Parascalops
 †Parascalops breweri
  †Parietobalaena
 †Parietobalaena palmeri
 Parus
 †Parus bicolor
 Parvanachis
 †Parvanachis obesa
 Passerella
 †Passerella iliaca
 Pecten
 †Pedalion
 Pedioecetes
 †Pedioecetes phasianellus
 Pekania
 †Pekania pennanti – or unidentified comparable form
  †Pelagornis
 †Pelocetus
 †Perimyotis
 †Perimyotis subflavus
 Perisoreus
 †Perisoreus canadensis
 Peristernia
 Peromyscus
 †Peromyscus leucopus
  †Peromyscus maniculatus
 Petaloconchus
 Petricola
 †Petricola pholadiformis
 Petrochelidon
 †Petrochelidon pyrrhonota
 Phalacrocorax
  †Phalacrocorax auritus
 Phenacomys
 †Phenacomys intermedius
 †Phenacomys ungava – or unidentified comparable form
 †Phocageneus – type locality for genus
 Pholadomya
 Pholas
 Phyllodus
 Physa
 †Physa heterostropha
 †Physogaleus
 †Physogaleus contortus
 †Phytolacca
 †Phytolacca decandra
 Pica
  †Pica pica
 Picea
 †Pinguinus
  †Pinguinus impennis
 Pinicola – or unidentified comparable form
 †Pinicola enucleator
 Pinus
 Pipistrellus
 †Pipistrellus subflavus
 Piranga
 Pisania
 Pisidium
 Pitar
 †Pitar morrhuanus
 Placopecten
  †Platygonus
 †Platygonus compressus
 Plecotus
 †Plecotus townsendii – or unidentified comparable form
 Pleuromeris
 †Pleuromeris tridentata
 Plicatula
 †Plicatula gibbosa
 Pluvialis
 †Pluvialis dominica
 Podiceps
  †Podiceps auritus
 Podilymbus
  †Podilymbus podiceps
 Pogonias
 Polinices
 Polydora
 Polygonum
 †Pomatiopsis
 †Pomatiopsis lapidaria
 †Pooecetes
 †Pooecetes gramineus
 Porzana
 †Porzana carolina
 †Potamogeton
  †Prionodon
 Prionotus
 Pristis
  †Procamelus – or unidentified comparable form
 †Procolpochelys
 Procyon
 †Procyon lotor
 †Prolates
 †Protautoga
 Prunum
 †Prunum roscidum
 Psammechinus
  †Psephophorus
 Pseudochama
 Pseudoliva
 Pseudotorinia
 Pteria
 †Pteria colymbus
 Pteromeris
 Pteromylaeus
 †Ptychosalpinx
 †Puppigerus
 Pycnodonte
  Pycnodus
 Quercus
 Quinqueloculina
 Raja
 Rallus
 †Rallus limicola
 †Rana
  †Rana catesbiana – lapsus calami of Rana catesbeiana
 †Rana clamitans – or unidentified comparable form
 †Rana palustris
 †Rana pipiens
 †Rana sylvatica – or unidentified comparable form
 Rangia
 Rangifer
  †Rangifer tarandus
 Ranzania
 †Retinella
 Retusa
 †Retusa obtusa
 Rhinobatos
 Rhinoptera
 Rosalina
 Rostellaria
 †Sarda
 Sayornis
 †Sayornis phoebe
 †Scala
 Scalopus
  †Scalopus aquaticus
 Scaphella
 Scaphiopus
 †Scaphiopus holbrooki
 Sceloporus
 †Sceloporus undulatus
 †Sceptrum
  †Schizodelphis
 Schizoporella
 Sciaenops
 †Sciaenops ocellatus
 †Sciaenurus – or unidentified comparable form
 Sciurus
  †Sciurus carolinensis
 Scolopax
  †Scolopax minor
 Scomberomorus
 †Scombrinus
 Scyliorhinus
 Seila
 †Seila adamsii
 †Seiurus
 Semele
 †Semotilus
 †Semotilus corporalis – or unidentified comparable form
 Serpulorbis
  †Serratolamna
 †Serratolamna lerichei
 †Sialia – or unidentified comparable form
 †Sialia sialis
 Sinum
 Sitta
  †Sitta canadensis
 †Solarium
 Solemya
 †Solemya velum
 Solen
 Solenosteira
 †Solenosteira cancellaria
 Sorex
 †Sorex arcticus
 †Sorex cinereus
 †Sorex dispar
 †Sorex fumeus
 †Sorex hoyi
  †Sorex palustris
 †Spatangus
 Spermophilus
 †Spermophilus tridecemlineatus
 Sphaerium
  Sphyraena
 †Sphyrapicus
 †Sphyrapicus varius
 Sphyrna
 Spilogale
 †Spilogale putorius
 Spisula
  †Squalodon
 †Squalodon calvertensis
 Squalus
 Squatina
 †Stenotrema
 †Stenotrema hirsutum
 Stewartia
 Storeria
  †Striatolamia
 Strioterebrum
  Strobilops
 Strombiformis
 Sturnella – or unidentified comparable form
 Sveltia – or unidentified comparable form
 †Syllomus
 Sylvilagus
  †Sylvilagus transitionalis
 Symplocos
 Synaptomys
 †Synaptomys cooperi
 Tagelus
 Tamias
 †Tamias striatus
 Tamiasciurus
 †Tamiasciurus hudsonicus
  Tapirus
 †Tapirus veroensis
 Tautoga
 †Tautoga onitis
 Tectonatica
 †Tectonatica pusilla
 Teinostoma
  Tellina
 Terebra
 Teredo
 Terrapene
 †Terrapene carolina
 Textularia
 Thamnophis
 †Thamnophis sirtalis
  †Thecachampsa
 †Thecachampsa antiqua
  †Thoracosaurus
 Thracia
 †Thuja
 †Thuja occidentalis
 Thunnus
 Tilia
 Toxostoma
 †Toxostoma rufum
 Triakis
 Trigonostoma
 Tringa – or unidentified comparable form
 †Tringa solitaria
 †Triodopsis
  †Triodopsis tridentata
 Triphora
 Trochita
 †Trochita trochiformis
 Trox
 †Tsuga
 †Tsuga canadensis – or unidentified comparable form
 Tucetona
 Turbonilla
 †Turbonilla interrupta
 Turdus
  †Turdus migratorius
 Turritella
 Uria
 †Uria aalge
 Urosalpinx
 †Urosalpinx cinerea
 Ursus
 †Ursus americanus
 Vallonia
 †Vallonia costata
 Valvata
 Venericardia
  Vermetus
 Vertigo
  Vitis
 Vitrinella
  †Voltaconger
 Voluta
 Volutifusus
 Vulpes
 Xenophora
  †Xiphiacetus
 Yoldia
 †Yoldia limatula
 Zapus
 †Zapus hudsonius
 Zonotrichia
 †Zonotrichia albicollis

References

 

Virginia